Erin M. Runions is an American religious studies scholar whose research focuses on the influence of the Bible on contemporary culture and politics. She is the Nancy J. Lyon Professor of Biblical History and Literature at Pomona College in Claremont, California.

Selected works 

 The Babylon Complex: Theopolitical Fantasies of War, Sex, and Sovereignty
 How Hysterical: Identification and Resistance in the Bible and Film
 Changing Subjects: Gender, Nation, Future in Micah

References

External links
Faculty page at Pomona College

Year of birth missing (living people)
Living people
Pomona College faculty
American biblical scholars